An election to the Islamic City Council of Tehran took place on 28 February 2003, along with the local elections nationwide.

The results showed a victory for the conservative Alliance of Builders of Islamic Iran, that gained 14 out of 15 seats, and a massive defeat for all of the Reformist groupings, as well as the Council of Nationalist-Religious Activists of Iran and the Freedom Movement of Iran.

The election is seen as the first in a series of electoral victories for the conservatives, followed by the 2004 legislative election and the 2005 presidential election. Historian Ervand Abrahamian attributes the result to the conservatives retaining their 25% voter base, while "large numbers of women, college students, and other members of the salaried middle class stayed home".

Voter turnout fell to 12% in this election.

This election also marked rise of Mahmoud Ahmadinejad to national prominence, because he was subsequently elected as the Mayor of Tehran and his profile was raised for his presidential campaign in 2005.

Campaign

Conservatives 

Most of the figures from the conservative camp sat out of the election and did not enroll as a candidate.

The faction put forward one single list under the banner of the Alliance of Builders of Islamic Iran (ABII), an alliance between old guard conservatives and new forces within the faction. The ABII billed themselves as technocrats with the expertise to run the city while key conservative parties and organizations kept a low-profile during the days leading to the election. No conservative party released candidate lists for the election.

Islamic Coalition Party's leading member Hamidreza Taraghi told press: "Our campaign policy is not to publish any statements or posters... we do not wish to politicize the situation... we are trying not to support those individuals who have greater political inclination than professional expertise".

Campaign manager of the ABII during the elections was Mahmoud Ahmadinejad. The campaign focused on calling for members of Basij and their families to vote for the group. In one newspaper ad, many ABII members appeared clean-shaven like their reformist rivals, in order to display technological seriousness.

Reformists 

The Reformists who supported the incumbent President Mohammad Khatami, entered the elections divided. The had engaged an inter-factional rivalry, possibly out of overconfidence that they will win the election. In January, disagreements were reported between 2nd of Khordad coalition members over compiling a shared list of candidates.

Association of Combatant Clerics (ACC) declared that it would not issue a list for itself, but will endorse a list of candidates if all reformist parties and organizations reach an agreement.

As the reformist parties were involved with infighting, student organizations and journalists who had played an important in mobilizing voters to support the reformists in previous elections were either silent or withdrew their support from the camp. The Office for Strengthening Unity (OSU) released a statement and declared that it is not supporting the reformists because they were not actually addressing people's concerns.

On 19 February 2003, Ali-Mohammad Gharbiani of election headquarters of the 2nd of Khordad coalition said that names of 33 candidates has been compiled for 15 spots on the final list. However, not every party agreed that all names should be on the list.

Major disagreements were reported in media between the Executives of Construction Party (ECP) and the Islamic Iran Solidarity Party (IISP). It was also reported that the latter had threatened that it would not be part of the coalition if its secretary-general Ebrahim Asgharzadeh is not included. Asgharzadeh had recently made negative remarks about Islamic Iran Participation Front (IIPF), a leading party in the coalition, which led to resignation of some IISP members in protest. On the other hand, Majid Farahani of the IIPF said his party will reconsider participation in the coalition if certain candidates are included in the list.

Due to differences of opinion being continued between these parties, each of the ECP, the IIPF and the IISF released separate candidate lists.

ECP campaign presented their candidates as "pragmatic "professionals" who can deliver better city services and end partisan bickering".

According to The Economist, the "star candidate" of the reformist camp was Mostafa Tajzadeh who belonged to the IIPF list. Analysts expected that the party would show poorly.

Religious-Nationalists 

Members of liberal opposition groups based inside Iran declared themselves candidates for the election. Due to the local elections being exempt from Guardian Council vetting process, the dissidents were allowing to run by the reformist-dominated election board in Tehran.

Among the groups were the Freedom Movement of Iran (FMI) and the Council of Nationalist-Religious Activists. The former issued a statement urging the voters to show up for the election, which said: "those not supporting the municipal elections are, in fact, against the council-oriented system of government and against democracy and the reform process".

Since the 1980s, the faction was banned from running for elections and their freedom to run was harshly criticized by the conservatives. A court sent a letter to the election board, calling the groups and their qualification illegal.

Ali Khamenei, Iran's Supreme Leader, slammed "irregularities" in qualifying members of the groups and said the elections would be invalidated if they won.

Campaign for Mohsen Sazegara 

Mohsen Sazegara who had been disillusioned with the reformists and tried to run in the 2001 presidential election against the incumbent President Mohammad Khatami (being disqualified by the Guardian Council), was jailed at the time of the election and in protest conducted a hunger strike. In the election, a list of fifteen liberals was announced by friends of Sazegara, led by one of his brothers, pledging to appoint Sazegara as the next mayor if they were elected. They printed big pictures of Sazegara and installed them on almost every major street in the city. Sazegara was soon released from imprisonment.

American conservative analyst Joshua Muravchik attributes release of Sazegara to the campaign, which caused the authorities "fearing that this might attract a large protest vote".

Results

References

Tehran
2003
2000s in Tehran